Kanigan (pronounced kan-i-an) is a rural locality split between the Fraser Coast Region and the Gympie Region, both in Queensland, Australia. In the  Kanigan had a population of 114 people.

History 
Kanyan railway station is in the adjacent locality of Theebine.  The name of this station was changed to Kanigan in July 1945 and changed back to Kanyan in December the same year.  In 1881 when the Maryborough to Gympie railway opened the station was described as "in the middle of a dense weedy pine scrub, known ... as Ramsay's, where there is nothing but a few tents and perhaps a truck or so of palings to indicate that the spot is a railway station named Kanyan.  [It] .. derives its title from the aboriginal name ' Kanyn' given to the creek and mountain close by.

Another version of the word Kanyan is that it is derived from the Aboriginal word, Kabi language, kanigan indicating daughter.

Kannagan Provisional School opened on 6 July 1896. By 1898 the spelling of the name had changed to be Kanighan Provisional School. On 1 January 1909 it became Kanighan State School. About 1946 the spelling changed to Kanigan State School. It closed in 1959.

In the  Kanigan had a population of 114 people.

Geography
Kanyan Road forms the northern boundary of the locality. 

Deacons Creek rises in the southern part of the locality and flows through to the north-east, where it exits. 

Mount Kanigan is in the north-west of the locality.

Mount Kanigan Nature Refuge is a  private nature reserve on Repeater Station Road.

Infrastructure
The Bruce Highway runs along the eastern boundary.

The 128 km Gympie (Mt Kanigan) Radar Loop in the south west of the locality is a doppler radar station that is part of the National Radar Loop of the Bureau of Meteorology.

References 

Fraser Coast Region
Gympie Region
Localities in Queensland